The Ice Arena (stylised as IceArenA) is an ice sports and public skate centre, opened on 17 September 1981 and located in Thebarton, Adelaide, South Australia. The Ice Arena is South Australia's premier ice skating facility located just minutes from the Adelaide CBD. The centre is the home of the Ice Factor Foundation Inc and the ice sports associations (SAISA, IHSA and BASA), and their respective clubs including Adelaide Adrenaline (AIHL), Adelaide Rush (AWIHL) and Adelaide Generals (AJIHL).

History

The centre first opened in 1981 as the Ice Arena with a full size skating rink surrounded by a speed skating track. 

In late 1987, the centre closed for the construction of the world's first indoor ski slope and reopened in 1988 as Mt Thebarton Snow and Ice, featuring what was reported to be the world's first indoor ski slope on artificial snow. 
To accommodate the new structure supporting the ski-slope and to make room for the bottom of the slope, the concentric skating rink concept was abandoned and replaced by two ice skating rinks (one large 56×26m rink and one smaller 30×15m surface). 
The centre underwent a further name change to Snowdome Adelaide. 

The facility temporarily closed in June 2005 due to the running costs of the centre, but it re-opened minus the indoor ski slope with the new name of IceArenA.

4 March 2016, the Large Ice was closed due to issues with the pipe works under the large ice.
Media release states that Ice Arena are in discussions with the government.

7 May 2016, the Large Ice reopened, with various dignitaries in attendance, after a government grant was provided to purchase a new, modern refrigeration plant.

15 September 2021, Ice Arena launches National Hockey Super League (NHSL), Australia's first professional Ice Hockey League.

Events

The venue offers a wide variety of activities including ice hockey lessons, ice skating lessons, snow play sessions, school holiday skating, birthday parties, public skating sessions, and it is also the home venue of the Adelaide Adrenaline ice hockey men's and women's teams.

See also
 List of ice rinks in Australia
 Sport in South Australia

References

External links
 IceArenA official site
 IceArenA Facebook
 Ice Skating Australia

Indoor ski resorts
Ski areas and resorts in South Australia
Tourist attractions in Adelaide
1981 establishments in Australia
Sports venues completed in 1981
Figure skating venues in Australia
Ice hockey venues in Australia
Speed skating venues in Australia
Sports venues in Adelaide
Indoor arenas in Australia